Dars-i Nizami is a study curriculum or system used in many Islamic institutions (madrassas) and Dar Ul Ulooms, which originated in the Indian subcontinent in the 18th century and can now also be found in parts of South Africa, Canada, the United States, the Caribbean and the UK.

The Dars-i Nizami system was developed by Nizamuddin Sihalivi (1161 AH/1748 CE) from the Firangi Mahal Ulama (Islamic scholars) group, after whom the Dars-i Nizami were named (Robinson, 2001: p72). Sihali is a village in Fatehpur Block in Barabanki District of Uttar Pradesh State, India

See also
 Darul Uloom
 Madrasah

References

External links
 darsenizami official site

Further reading
 

Madrasas
Islamic education
Curricula
Islam in India
Islam in Pakistan